Lucy Ragsdale High School, commonly known as Ragsdale High, is a public high school in Jamestown, North Carolina. Opened in 1959, Ragsdale is one of 26 high schools in Guilford County Schools. The areas that are zoned to Ragsdale's district include areas of northeastern High Point, southeast Jamestown, and the Adams Farm/Sedgefield area of Greensboro. The school's current principal is Jim Gibson.

History 
Built in 1959, this school was named after Lucy Coffin Ragsdale, who was an advocate for public school education in Jamestown. In 1962, Ragsdale was accredited by the Southern Association of Colleges and Schools.

Campus 
The High School is an excellent example of postwar functionalist architecture and bears a striking similarity to several other local schools commissioned and built around the same period. In recent years however, due in large part to a lack of funding and delayed investment in new buildings, much of the campus has fallen into disrepair. Many classes are now held in semi-permanent mobile units and the school as a whole is suffering from overcrowding. Construction has been completed on a new Jamestown Middle School located off of Harvey Road, south of the current site. The relocation of the middle school has resulted in Ragsdale's acquisition of Jamestown Middle School's facilities. Construction was set to begin in late 2010, but due to insufficient funds from the School Board System, construction was delayed another year. The construction was completed in 2012.

Athletics 
The Ragsdale Tigers compete in the Piedmont-Triad 4-A Conference. Ragsdale fields teams in baseball, basketball, cheerleading, cross country, football, golf, lacrosse, soccer, softball, swimming, tennis, track (indoor and outdoor), volleyball, and wrestling.  Past principal, Dr. Kathryn Rogers, received the  Bob Deaton Principal of the Year Award from the NCHSAA's (North Carolina High School Athletic Association) annual meeting in Chapel Hill in early May 2010.

Curriculum 
The school course work ranges from College Placement, Honors, and to Advanced Placement of study.  Considering Ragsdale High School is on a "block schedule", most classes are one semester in length.  All CP and Honors courses are restricted to one semester, but few AP courses stretch through the entire year.  Advanced Placement courses consist of: Calculus AB, Calculus BC, Statistics, U.S. Government and Politics, Psychology, European History, World History, U.S. History, Latin, French, Spanish, English 11, English 12, Biology, Chemistry, Environmental, Art History, Art, and Music Theory.

On August 28, 2019, Ragsdale was awarded the Hubert B. Humphrey Award, which recognizes exemplary improvement in academic improvement in areas such as final exam scores, Career and Technical Education participation, and graduation rates.

Notable alumni 
 Jimmy Armstrong, former NFL cornerback
 Winston Craig, former NFL defensive tackle
 Mark Dixon, former NFL offensive guard
 Pat McCrory, 53rd mayor of Charlotte and 74th Governor of North Carolina (2013–2017)
 Siri Mullinix, goalie for 2000 U.S. Women's Olympic Soccer Team
 Paul Martin Newby, Chief Justice of the North Carolina Supreme Court (2021–present)
 Larry Ogunjobi, current NFL defensive tackle
 Rayveness, adult film actress
 Kasey Redfern, former NFL punter
 Carson Ware, NASCAR Xfinity Series driver
 Cody Ware, NASCAR Cup Series and IMSA WeatherTech Sports Car Series driver

References

External links 
 Ragsdale High School
 Ragsdale High School Band

Educational institutions established in 1959
Public high schools in North Carolina
Schools in Guilford County, North Carolina
1959 establishments in North Carolina